Pavlo Mykolayovych Stepanets (born 26 May 1987) is a Ukrainian professional football player. He also holds Russian citizenship as Pavel Nikolayevich Stepanets.

Career
On 29 February 2020, Stepanets signed for Ararat Yerevan.

After being released by Ararat Yerevan on 24 July 2020, Stepanets signed for FC Urartu on 12 September 2020. His contract was terminated by mutual consent on 12 January 2021.

References

External links
 
 

1987 births
Living people
Ukrainian footballers
Ukraine youth international footballers
Ukraine under-21 international footballers
Ukrainian expatriate footballers
Association football midfielders
FC Ural Yekaterinburg players
FC Mordovia Saransk players
FC Ufa players
FC Fakel Voronezh players
FC Baltika Kaliningrad players
FC Tyumen players
FC Luch Vladivostok players
FC Ararat Yerevan players
FC Urartu players
Russian Premier League players
Armenian Premier League players
Expatriate footballers in Russia
Expatriate footballers in Armenia
Ukrainian expatriate sportspeople in Russia
Ukrainian expatriate sportspeople in Armenia
PFC CSKA Moscow players
FC Spartak Nizhny Novgorod players
Sportspeople from Chernihiv Oblast